is a railway station on the Senmō Main Line in Abashiri, Hokkaido, Japan, operated by Hokkaido Railway Company (JR Hokkaido). It is numbered "B78".

Lines

Adjacent stations

History

The station opened on 15 November 1924.

From late 2014, a new wooden waiting room was built to replace the previous station structure.

Surrounding area
 National Route 244

See also
 List of railway stations in Japan

References

External links

 JR Hokkaido Masuura Station information 

Stations of Hokkaido Railway Company
Railway stations in Hokkaido Prefecture
Railway stations in Japan opened in 1924